Somer Brook (also known as Somers Brook) is a tributary of Mehoopany Creek in Wyoming County, Pennsylvania, in the United States. The stream is not designated as an impaired waterbody and is classified as a High-Quality Coldwater Fishery. Fauna that have been observed in the stream's vicinity include northern water shrews and trout.

Course
Somer Brook begins in a wetland at the top of South Mountain in Noxen Township. It flows northwest for a short distance before turning southwest for a short distance and entering another wetland. Here, the stream turns north for a short distance before turning east-northeast for a few tenths of a mile and entering a third wetland. It then turns southwest before turning east-northeast for a few tenths of a mile and entering Forkston Township. Here, the stream enters a valley and turns north for a few tenths of a mile before gradually turning north-northeast for several tenths of a mile. It then turns north-northwest for several tenths of a mile before turning north. After several tenths of a mile, the stream reaches the end of its valley and reaches its confluence with Mehoopany Creek.

Hydrology
Somer Brook is not designated as an impaired waterbody.

In August 1995, Somer Brook received several water quality measurements. The pH of the stream ranged from 5.0 to 5.1, with an average of 5.0, and the conductivity ranged from 3.3 to 3.5 uohms/cm with an average of 3.4.

Geography and geology

Somer Brook is one of five large brooks to descend from a high, flat-topped mountain that separates the Mehoopany Creek watershed from the Bowman Creek watershed. Going from southwest to northeast, Somer Brook is the second of these brooks.

In the late 1800s, coal deposits were rumored to occur at the headwaters of Somer Brook.

Watershed
The stream is entirely within the United States Geological Survey quadrangle of Dutch Mountain. Its mouth is located at Kasson Brook. The designated use of the stream is for aquatic life.

History and recreation
Somer Brook was entered into the Geographic Names Information System on August 2, 1979. Its identifier in the Geographic Names Information System is 1199559. The stream is also known as Somers Brook. This variant name appears on some United States Geological Survey topographic maps.

In March 2016, the Pennsylvania Department of Environmental Protection collected samples from Somer Brook in response to a request to re-evaluate these streams, as the streams in the Mehoopany Creek watershed had not been assessed in several years.

Somer Brook is described as "scenic" in Jeff Mitchell's book Hiking the Endless Mountains. There are numerous old forest roads suitable for hiking in the area.

Biology
Wild trout naturally reproduce in Somer Brook from its headwaters downstream to its mouth. The stream is classified as a High-Quality Coldwater Fishery.

In 1995, northern water shrews were found at Somer Brook.

See also
Stony Brook (Mehoopany Creek), next tributary of Mehoopany Creek going downstream
Becker Brook, next tributary of Mehoopany Creek going upstream
List of rivers of Pennsylvania

References

Tributaries of Mehoopany Creek